Toxemia may refer to:

 A generic term for the presence of toxins in the blood, see Bacteremia#Consequences
 Another term for Pre-eclampsia

tr:Toksemi